SS Washingtonian was a cargo ship launched in 1913 by the Maryland Steel Company of Sparrows Point, Maryland, near Baltimore,  as one of eight sister ships for the American-Hawaiian Steamship Company. At the time of her launch, she was the largest cargo ship under American registry. During the United States occupation of Veracruz in April 1914, Washingtonian was chartered by the United States Department of the Navy for service as a non-commissioned refrigerated supply ship for the U.S. fleet stationed off the Mexican coast.

In the days after Washingtonians sinking, the price of sugar in the United States increased almost nine percent, partly attributed to the loss of Washingtonians cargo.

Design and construction 
In November 1911, the American-Hawaiian Steamship Company placed an order with the Maryland Steel Company of Sparrows Point, Maryland, for two new cargo ships— and Washingtonian. The contract cost of the ships was set at the construction cost plus an eight percent profit for Maryland Steel, but capped at a maximum cost of $640,000 each. The construction was financed by Maryland Steel with a credit plan that called for a five percent down payment in cash and nine monthly installments for the balance. The deal had provisions that allowed some of the nine installments to be converted into longer-term notes or mortgages. The final cost of Washingtonian, including financing costs, was $71.49 per deadweight ton, which totaled just under $733,000.

Washingtonian (Maryland Steel yard no. 131) was the second ship built under the contract.

Service 
When Washingtonian began sailing for American-Hawaiian, the company shipped cargo from East Coast ports via the Tehuantepec Route to West Coast ports and Hawaii, and vice versa. Shipments on the Tehuantepec Route arrived at Mexican ports—Salina Cruz, Oaxaca, for eastbound cargo, and Coatzacoalcos, Veracruz, for westbound cargo—and traversed the Isthmus of Tehuantepec on the Tehuantepec National Railway. Eastbound shipments were primarily sugar and pineapple from Hawaii, while westbound cargoes were more general in nature. Washingtonian sailed in this service, but it is not known whether she sailed on the east or west side of North America.

After the United States occupation of Veracruz on 21 April 1914 (which took place while six American-Hawaiian line ships were being held in various Mexican ports), the Huerta-led Mexican government closed the Tehuantepec National Railway to American shipping. This loss of access (the Panama Canal was not yet open until later that year) caused American-Hawaiian to return to its historic route of sailing around South America via the Strait of Magellan in late April. During the U.S. occupation, the Washingtonian was chartered by the U.S. Navy Department to serve as a non-commissioned refrigerator and supply ship for the U.S. naval fleet off Mexico.

With the official opening of the Panama Canal on 15 August 1914, American-Hawaiian line ships switched to taking the isthmus canal route. In late August, American-Hawaiian announced that the Washingtonian—her Navy charter ended by this time—would sail on a San Francisco – Panama Canal – Boston route, sailing opposite vessels , Honolulan, and sister ship Pennsylvanian.

Washingtonian sailed from Los Angeles in early October with a load of California products—including canned and dried fruits, beans, and wine—for New York City and Boston. After delivering that load, Washingtonian then headed for Honolulu, Hawaii, to take on a  load of raw sugar valued at about $1,000,000. Departing Honolulu on 20 December, Washingtonian arrived at Balboa on 17 January 1915 and transited the Panama Canal. Sailing from Cristóbal on the eastern end two days later, she headed for the Delaware Breakwater en route to Philadelphia.

Collision 
Elizabeth Palmers captain saw a large steam vessel, Washingtonian, on an apparent collision course ahead, but did not change course since navigational rules require steam-powered vessels to yield to vessels under sail power. The captain of Washingtonian, two quartermasters, and a seaman were all on watch and saw Elizabeth Palmer, but misjudged the schooner's rapid pace. Less than a mile (2 km) away, Elizabeth Palmer, with her jib boom and the top of her foremast stripped away by the impact, began taking on water through her split seams. When it became apparent that the big schooner would sink, her captain ordered her abandonment, and she slowly settled and went down about an hour after the collision. After Washingtonians crew abandoned ship, one crewman, a water tender, was found to be missing and was presumed drowned. Washingtonians 39 survivors and all 13 crew members from Elizabeth Palmer were picked up  about an hour after the collision by the passenger liner Hamilton of the Old Dominion Line, which arrived at New York the next day.

The collision had repercussions for American-Hawaiian and the world sugar market. The financial impact of the collision on American-Hawaiian, estimated at $2,000,000, was devastating. Contemporary news reports in The New York Times and The Wall Street Journal both told of the collision's impact on the sugar market. Claus A. Spreckels, president of Federal Sugar Refining, noted that the loss of even such a large cargo would not normally have much effect on the sugar market. However, weather in Cuba, then the largest supplier of sugar for the United States, had reduced that island nation's crop by more than 200,000 tons. Further affecting the situation was World War I, then ongoing in Europe, which had reduced the tonnage of shipping available to transport commodities like sugar. With all of these factors, the asking price for sugar futures contracts for February 1915 delivery was 2.90 cents per pound (6.39 cents per kg) a week before Washingtonians sinking, but had risen to 3.16 cents per pound (6.96 cents per kg) the day after the sinking.

A popular night dive, Washingtonians wreck is also a favorite with sport divers catching lobster.

Notes

References

Bibliography 

 
 
 

Ships built in Sparrows Point, Maryland
Merchant ships of the United States
Maritime incidents in 1915
Shipwrecks in the Atlantic Ocean
Shipwrecks of the Delaware coast
Wreck diving sites
Underwater diving sites in the United States
1913 ships
Cargo ships of the United States Navy
Ships sunk in collisions